Senator Farnsworth may refer to:

Daniel D. T. Farnsworth (1819–1892), West Virginia State Senate
Dave Farnsworth (born 1951), Arizona State Senate
Eddie Farnsworth (born 1961), Arizona State Senate
Hiram Warner Farnsworth (1816–1899), Territorial Senate of Kansas
Thomas J. Farnsworth (1829–1916), West Virginia State Senate
Walter K. Farnsworth (1870–1929), Vermont State Senate